Wittenburg is an Amt in the Ludwigslust-Parchim district, in Mecklenburg-Vorpommern, Germany. The seat of the Amt is in Wittenburg.

The Amt Wittenburg consists of the following municipalities:
Wittenburg
Wittendörp

External links
 Official website in German

Ämter in Mecklenburg-Western Pomerania